Li Chang (12 December 1914 – 3 September 2010) was an official of the People's Republic of China. He served as the Secretary of Central Commission for Discipline Inspection of the CPC from 1982 to 1985, then as member of the Central Advisory Commission of the CPC Central Committee. Li joined the Chinese Communist Party in the 1930s, and later rose in prominence as a reformist. He was one of the key comrades of Deng Xiaoping.

References 

1914 births
2010 deaths
Beijing International Studies University people
Chinese Communist Party politicians from Hunan
Delegates to the 7th National Congress of the Chinese Communist Party
People's Republic of China politicians from Hunan
Politicians from Xiangxi
Presidents of Beijing International Studies University
Tsinghua University alumni